Ovidiu Ștefan Hoban (born 27 December 1982) is a Romanian professional footballer who plays as a defensive midfielder for Liga I club CFR Cluj.

International career
Hoban made his international debut against Trinidad & Tobago, playing the second half of a friendly game on 4 June 2013. He scored his first international goal during the UEFA Euro 2016 qualifying against Finland in an eventual 1–1 draw. He was selected in the 23-man squad for UEFA Euro 2016 and started in Romania's opening match against France before being used as a substitute in their following game against Switzerland. He started in their final match against Albania which they lost 1-0 and were eliminated from the tournament.

Career statistics

International

Scores and results list Romania's goal tally first, score column indicates score after each Hoban goal.

Honours
Petrolul Ploiești
Cupa României: 2012–13
Supercupa României runner-up: 2013

Hapoel Be'er Sheva
Israeli Premier League: 2015–16, 2016–17
Israel Super Cup: 2016
Toto Cup: 2016–17

CFR Cluj
Liga I: 2017–18, 2018–19, 2019–20, 2020–21, 2021–22
Supercupa României: 2018, 2020

Individual
Toto Cup top scorer: 2015–16 (3 goals)

References

External links
 
 
 
 

1982 births
Living people
Sportspeople from Baia Mare
Romanian footballers
Association football midfielders
CS Minaur Baia Mare (football) players
FC U Craiova 1948 players
FC Bihor Oradea players
CS Gaz Metan Mediaș players
FC Universitatea Cluj players
FC Petrolul Ploiești players
Hapoel Be'er Sheva F.C. players
CFR Cluj players
Liga I players
Liga III players
Israeli Premier League players
Romanian expatriate footballers
Expatriate footballers in Germany
Romanian expatriate sportspeople in Germany
Expatriate footballers in Israel
Romanian expatriate sportspeople in Israel
Romania international footballers
UEFA Euro 2016 players